Alan Lavers (6 September 1912 – 25 October 1995) was an English cricketer. He played for Essex between 1937 and 1953.

References

External links

1912 births
1995 deaths
English cricketers
Essex cricketers
Cricketers from Melbourne
Marylebone Cricket Club cricketers